Zimní stadion Na Lapači is an indoor sporting arena located in Vsetín, Czech Republic. The capacity of the arena is 5,400 people and was built in 1964. It is currently home to the VHK Vsetín ice hockey team.

References 
 Information from the official website

Indoor ice hockey venues in the Czech Republic
Vsetín District
1964 establishments in Czechoslovakia
Sports venues completed in 1964
20th-century architecture in the Czech Republic